is a Japanese voice actor and singer affiliated with Raccoon Dog. He won the Best New Actor Award at the 3rd Seiyu Awards and Best Supporting Actor Award at the 5th Seiyu Awards.

Voice acting career
In an interview held at the Anime Expo, when answering what inspired him to become a voice actor, Nobuhiko Okamoto mentioned that he has always been a big fan of Slam Dunk and thought the character Rukawa was really cool, so he wanted to be like him.

In the third Seiyu Awards held on March 7, 2009, he won the award for best rookie actor for his portrayals of Accelerator in A Certain Magical Index, Shin Kanzato in Persona: Trinity Soul, and Ryuji Kuhoin in Kure-nai, when he graduated from university.

In the fifth Seiyu Awards held on March 5, 2011, he won the award for best actor in a supporting role for his portrayals of Takumi Usui in Maid Sama!, Eiji Niizuma in Bakuman, and Accelerator in A Certain Magical Index.

He has voiced Yū Nishinoya in Haikyu!!, Katsuki Bakugo in My Hero Academia, Rin Okumura in Blue Exorcist, Ghiaccio in JoJo's Bizarre Adventure, Karma Akabane in Assassination Classroom, Isaac "Zack" Foster in Angels of Death, Yoichi Saotome in Seraph of the End, Louis Napoleon in Captain Tsubasa, Khun Aguero Agnes in Tower of God, Genya Shinazugawa in Demon Slayer: Kimetsu no Yaiba, Ryo Kurokiba in Food Wars: Shokugeki no Soma, Garfiel Tinsel in Re:Zero − Starting Life in Another World, Bete Loga in Is It Wrong to Try to Pick Up Girls in a Dungeon?, Liebe in Black Clover, and Obi in Snow White with the Red Hair.

Okamoto established and transferred to a new voice talent agency Raccoon Dog on April 1, 2022, following the closure of Pro-Fit on March 31.

Music career
Nobuhiko has voiced many roles, including his involvement in character CDs and insert songs (soundtracks) for the anime. On his 25th birthday, he announced his singing debut for the year 2012. On May 23, he released his first EP, Palette which reached number 9 on the weekly Oricon chart. On June 5, 2013, he released his second EP, Enjoy Full. On March 19, 2014, he released his first single, .

Personal life
He is skilled at playing shogi, having the Shogi Certification in 3rd Class. He appeared in several shogi events on Niconico and appeared in a Pokémon game event on Niconico as well. He also loves to play badminton. He's also the host of a radio program about gaming called RADIO 4Gamer from 2010 to 2015. Later, the program changed its name to RADIO 4Gamer Tap and continued on with Okamoto still being the host. The show was available on YouTube channel "4GamerSP." In his spare time he plays video games.

On March 21, 2020, Okamoto revealed that he is married to Asuka Ōgame after Shūkan Bunshun reported allegations of him having an extramarital affair. He apologized for his actions.

Filmography

Television animation

Original video animation (OVA)
Akikan!: Perfection!? The Hot Spring Panic (2009) as Gorō Amaji
Megane na Kanojo (2010) as Jun'ichi Kamiya
Air Gear: Break on the Sky (2011) as Itsuki Minami
Blue Exorcist: Runaway Kuro (2011) as Rin Okumura
Shukufuku no Campanella OVA (2011) as Leicester Maycraft
Code:Breaker (2012) as Rei Ōgami
Hanayaka Nari, Waga Ichizoku: Kinetograph (2012) as Masashi Miyanomori
Assassination Classroom (2013) as Akabane Karma
Brothers Conflict OVA 2 (2013) as Hikaru Asahina
Kamisama Kiss (2013) as Mizuki
Hybrid Child (2014–2015) as Kotarō Izumi
Star-Myu: High School Star Musical (2016) as Rui Tatsumi
Kamisama Hajimemashita: Kako-hen (2016) as Mizuki

Original net animation (ONA)
 Momokuri (2015) as Shinya Momotsuki (Momo)
 Koro Sensei Quest (2016) as Karma Akabane
 The Heike Story (2021) as Taira no Sukemori
Beyblade Burst Dynamite Battle (2021) as Phenomeno Payne
 Tiger & Bunny 2 (2022) as Ivan Karelin/Origami Cyclone

Theatrical animation
Blue Exorcist: The Movie (2012) as Rin Okumura
Tiger & Bunny: The Beginning (2012) as Ivan Karelin/Origami Cyclone
Toaru Majutsu no Index: Endyumion no Kiseki (2013) as Accelerator
Patema Inverted (2013) as Age
Saint Seiya: Legend of Sanctuary (2014) as Andromeda Shun
Sekai-ichi Hatsukoi: Yokozawa Takafumi no Baai (2014) as Shōta Kisa
Tiger & Bunny: The Rising (2014) as Ivan Karelin/Origami Cyclone
Gekijōban Meiji Tokyo Renka: Yumihari no Serenade (2015) as Kyōka Izumi
Assassination Classroom The Movie: 365 Days (2016) as Karma Akabane
Koro-sensei Q! (2016) as Karma Akabane
My Hero Academia: Two Heroes (2018) as Katsuki Bakugō
Fafner in the Azure: The Beyond (2019) as Chaos Partland
My Hero Academia: Heroes Rising (2019) as Katsuki Bakugō
WAVE!! Surfing Yappe!! (2020) as Rindō Fuke
My Hero Academia: World Heroes' Mission (2021) as Katsuki Bakugō
Teasing Master Takagi-san: The Movie (2022) as Takao
Break of Dawn (2022) as Ginnosuke Tadokoro
Rakudai Majo: Fūka to Yami no Majo (2023) as Kai

Drama CDs

Barajou No Kiss as Ninufa
Heaven's Memo Pad as Hitoshi Mukai
Nabari no Ou as Gau Meguro
Rikei Danshi as Hazeru Mizunomoto (see below)
Weekly Lying (Shukan Soine CD Series Vol.8 Ryo) as Ryo
A Certain Scientific Railgun as Accelerator
Yumeiro Patissiere as Makoto Kashino
Tonari no Kaibutsu-kun as Sasahara Sohei
Photograph Journey as Takara Yuzurihara
Honeymoon Vol. 14 as Ayumu Kaido
E:Robotts Model.917 as Shinonome
Brothers Conflict Series 2 Vol. 4 as Hikaru Asahina
 The Best Place Vol. 2 as Ryo Tachibana
Ookami-kunchi: Wolves Brothers Home as Ookami Heat
Lovesick Ellie as Omi

Video games
2006
 Granado Espada as Racel
2009
 Little Anchor as Yoshua Lineberger（ヨシュア・ラインベルカー）
2010
 NieR Replicant as Nier
 Chaos Rings as Ayuta
 Death Connection as Leonardo
2011
 Corpse Party: Book of Shadows as Tsukasa Mikuni
 La storia della Arcana Famiglia as Ash
 Meiji Tokyo Renka as Izumi Kyoka
 Sleepy-time Boyfriend as Ryo
2012
 12 Ji no Kane no Cinderella ~Halloween Wedding~ as Roy Difentarl
 Be My Princess as Prince Wilfred Spencer
 Black Wolves Saga as Pearl
 Brothers Conflict: Passion Pink as Hikaru Asahina
 Jyuzaengi Engetsu Sangokuden as Cho Hi
 Lollipop Chainsaw as Swan and Killabilly
 Mobile Suit Gundam: Extreme Vs. Full Boost as Leos Alloy
 SD Gundam G Generation Overworld as Fon Spaak
 Tokyo Babel as Uliel
2013
 2/2 Lover: Angels and Demons as Hinata, Setsuna
 Hanasaku Manimani as Fujishige Takara
 Hanayaka Nari, Waga Ichizoku Tasogare Polar Star as Masashi Miyanomori
 Koibana Days as Araragi Tsukasa
 Minus Eight as Maya Kazahara
 School Wars ~Sotsugyou Sensen~ as Naezono Oji
 Seishun Hajimemashita as Rikuno Kanade
 Storm Lovers 2 as Nanao Shiina
 Toki no Kizuna Hanayui Tsuzuri as Hatsushimo Senkimaru
2014
 Devil Survivor 2 Break Record as Daichi Shijima
 Dynamic Chord as Chiya Suzuno
Gakuen Heaven 2: Double Scramble as Reon Yagami
 Happy+Sugar=Darlin as Tamaki Satomi
 Heart no Kuni no Alice ~Wonderful Twin World~ as Humpty & Dumpty
 Pokemon Omega Ruby and Alpha Sapphire as Yuki (Brendan)
 Re-Vice[D] as Yukine
 Root Rexx as Soma Shiraishi
 Sengoku Basara 4 as Shibata Katsuie
 Vinculum Hearts ~Iris Mahou Gakko~ as Iris
2015
 Hyakka Yakou as Toki Kage
 Luminous Arc Infinity as Seed
 Touken Ranbu as Hizamaru
 Yume Oukoku to Nemureru 100 nin no Ouji-sama as Lecien
 Granblue Fantasy as Ceylan
2016
 Digimon World: Next Order as Shoma Tsuzuki
 Ikemen Revolution: Alice and Love Magic as Lancelot Kingsley
 Ikemen Royal Palace: Cinderella in Midnight as Rayvis Harnei
 Fate/Grand Order as Assassin of Shinjuku/Yan Qing
 Bungo to Alchemist as Tanizaki Junichirou

2017
 Granblue Fantasy as Gilbert

2018
 My Hero: One's Justice as Katsuki Bakugo
 The Thousand Musketeers as Hokusai
 Dragalia Lost as Orsem
 Shinen Resist as Rosa
 World End Heroes as Rinri Kitamura
 Food Fantasy as Souffle and Tequila
 Piofiore: Fated Memories as Yang

2019
 Onmyoji as Ootakemaru
 Warriors Orochi 4 Ultimate as Iqbaal Ramadhan
 SD Gundam G Generation Cross Rays as Fon Spaak
 BlackStar - Theatre Starless as Mizuki
 A Certain Magical Index: Imaginary Fest as Accelerator

2020
 Yakuza: Like a Dragon as Tianyou Zhao
 Disney: Twisted-Wonderland as Floyd Leech
 Identity V as Naib Subedar
 Helios Rising Heroes as Gray Reverse

2021
 Cookie Run: Kingdom as Mint Choco Cookie

2022
JoJo's Bizarre Adventure: All Star Battle R as Ghiaccio
 The Diofield Chronicle as Andrias Rhondarson

2023
 Fire Emblem Engage as Alcryst
Da Capo 5 as Haruto Mukoujima

Dubbing
 Freddie Highmore
 Bates Motel (Norman Bates)
 The Good Doctor (Dr. Shaun Murphy)
Leonardo (Stefano Giraldi)
 Power Rangers Mystic Force (Charlie "Chip" Thorn / Yellow Mystic Ranger (Nic Sampson))
 Ms. Marvel (Kareem / Red Dagger (Aramis Knight))
 The Last Summoner (Ah Jie)

Discography

Mini-albums

Singles

Anime songs
 Chrome Shelled Reg
ios (as Layfon Alseif)
 (2009.08.07) Kokaku no Regios Character Songs -The First Session-
 愛のツェルニ (Ai no Zuellni) Feat. Layfon Alseif & Leerin Marfes (with Mikako Takahashi)
 (2009.08.28) Kokaku no Regios Character Songs -The Second Session-
 愛のツェルニ (Ai no Zuellni) Feat. Layfon Alseif
 Maid Sama! (as Takumi Usui)
 (2010.07.22) Kaichou wa Maid-sama! Character Concept CD4 – Another Side
 Promise
 Yumekui Merry (as Yumeji Fujiwara)
 (2011.02.25) Yumekui Merry Character Song – Fujiwara Yumeji
 終わらない夜を (Owaranai Yoru o)
 何色インユアドリーム (Nani iro in Your Dream)
 Sekaiichi Hatsukoi (as Kisa Shouta)
 (2011.07.06) Sekai-ichi Hatsukoi Character Song Vol.3 Shoudou Alarm – Shouta Kisa
 衝動アラーム (Shodo Alarm)
 君に出逢えた奇跡 (Kimi Ni Deaeta Kiseki)
 Pretty Rhythm: Aurora Dream (as Wataru)
 (2011.07.20) Pretty Rhythm Aurora Dream Livetic Character Song act.4 1/1000 no Bigaku (as Callings with Takashi Kondō and Kenn)
 1/1000永遠の美学 (1/1000 Eien no Bigaku)
 1/1000永遠の美学 <instrumental>
 (2012.03.16) Pretty Rhythm Aurora Dream Prism Music Collection DX (as Callings)
 1/1000 永遠の美学 (1/1000 Eien no Bigaku)
 愛しのティンカーベル (Itoshi no Tinker Bell)
 Toaru Majutsu no Index and Toaru Majutsu no Index II' (as Accelerator)
 (2011.08.24) To Aru Majutsu no Index II Archives 4
 99.9% Noisy
 Sacred Seven (as Night Terushima)
 (2011.12.07) Sacred Seven Drama Character Album IV Fragment of S7 Kijima Night x Lau Feizooi
 Knight of Light
 Tiger & Bunny (as Ivan Karelin/Origami Cyclone)
 (2012.02.08) Tiger & Bunny Character Song Album Best of Hero
 Ao no Exorcist (as Rin Okumura)
 (2011.08.24) Ao no Exorcist OP2 – In My World
 In My World -青の炎 Edition- With Rin Okumura & Yukio Okumura (with Rookiez is Punk'd and Jun Fukuyama)
 (2011.08.31) Ao no Exorcist ED2 – Wired Life
 Wired Life (No Escape Remix) feat. Okumura Rin
 (2012.04.18) Atchi de Kotchi de (あっちでこっちで) (Atchi Kotchi opening single)
 あっちでこっちで (Atchi de Kotchi de) (as Atchi Kotchi with Rumi Ōkubo, Hitomi Nabatame, Kaori Fukuhara & Shintarō Asanuma)
 あっちこっちまいにち! (Atchi Kotchi Mainichi!) (duet with Rumi Ōkubo)
 あっちでこっちで (Instrumental)
 あっちこっちまいにち! (Instrumental)
 (2012.11.28) Retrospective World (Aoi Sekai no Chūshin de opening single)
 Retrospective World (duet with Hiro Shimono)
 Retrospective World (Gear solo version (ギア Solo バージョン))
 Retrospective World (Tezhilov solo version (テジロフ Solo バージョン))
 Retrospective World (Anime OP version (アニメOP バージョン))
 Retrospective World (off vocal version)
(2013.07.31) 14 to 1 (Brothers Conflict ending single) (as Hikaru Asahina)
 14 to 1 (as Asahina Bros.+ Juli with Kenn, Daisuke Namikawa, Hiroshi Kamiya, Junichi Suwabe, Ken Takeuchi, Kazuyuki Okitsu, Tomoaki Maeno, Daisuke Ono, Kenichi Suzumura, Daisuke Hirakawa, Yūki Kaji, Yoshimasa Hosoya)
(2014.10.01) Meiji Tokyo Renka Single – "Lunatic Kiss" (as Izumi Kyouka)
Lunatic Kiss (duet with Kenn)
Nostalgia (duet with Kenn)
(2015.01.28) Brothers Conflict OVA ending single (as Hikaru Asahina)
I Love You ga Kikoenai (as Asahina Bros. + Juli with Kenn, Daisuke Namikawa, Hiroshi Kamiya, Junichi Suwabe, Ken Takeuchi, Kazuyuki Okitsu, Tomoaki Maeno, Daisuke Ono, Kenichi Suzumura, Daisuke Hirakawa, Yūki Kaji, Yoshimasa Hosoya)
 見切れ桜 (Mikire Zakura)
 (2013.05.15) Tiger & Bunny -Single Relay Project "Circuit Of Hero" Vol.3
 青春Honesty (Seishun Honesty) (with Go Inoue)
 (2013.06.12) Tiger & Bunny -Single Relay Project "Circuit Of Hero" Vol.4
 見切れヒーローイズム (Mikire Heroism)
 チャチャチャdeワッショイ (Chachacha de wasshoi) (with Mariya Ise)
 Place to Place (as Io Otonashi)
 (2012.05.16) Atchi Kotchi Character Song Mini-Album
 キラメキサイクル (Kirameki cycle)
 Sakamichi no Apollon (as Seiji Matsuoka)
 (2012.07.25) Kids on the Slope Original Soundtrack Plus more & rare
 Hey Boy featuring Nobuhiko Okamoto as Seiji Matsuoka sings (ヘイボーイ <featuring 岡本信彦 as Seiji Matsuoka sings>)
 Bang Bang Bang featuring Nobuhiko Okamoto as Seiji Matsuoka sings (バンバンバン <featuring 岡本信彦 as Seiji Matsuoka sings>)
 Code:Breaker (as Rei Ōgami)
 (2012.11.28) Code:Breaker Character Song Vol.1
 Restoration to 0
 Ao no Exorcist (as Rin Okumura)
 (2012.12.19) Blue Exorcist Character Song
 Trailblazer
 Hakkenden: Eight Dogs of the East (as Murasame)
 (2013.03.22) Hakkenden -Touhou Hakken Ibun- Image Song CD Vol.1
 無敵のBuddy Muteki no Buddy
 Kamisama Hajimemashita (as Mizuki)
 (2013.03.20) Kamisama Hajimemashita Bonus CD Vol. 4
Hitoshizuku 
 (2013.04.17) Kamisama Hajimemashita Bonus CD Vol. 5
 ひとりあやとり (Hitori Ayatori)
 Bakuman (as Niizuma Eiji)
 (2013.07.24) Bakuman Character Cover Song Collection Album
"Romance" (cover of original song by Penicillin)
"Waiwai World" (cover of original Dr. Slump – Arale-chan opening theme) 
 Brother Conflict (as Hikaru Asahina)
Brothers Conflict Concept Mini-Album – O*TO*NA 
 Gossip (duet with Daisuke Hirakawa)
 Otona Breakout (with Kazuyuki Okitsu, Daisuke Hirakawa, Junichi Suwabe, Kenichi Suzumura, Kosuke Toriumi, and Tomoaki Maeno)
Brothers Conflict Vol. 3 Extras
2 to 1 (duet with Daisuke Hirakawa)
Brothers Conflict Christmas OVA 
Brand New Venus (with Kazuyuki Okitsu, Junichi Suwabe, Tomoaki Maeno, Yoshimasa Hosoya, and Kenn)
O*HA*YO (with Kazuyuki Okitsu, Junichi Suwabe, Tomoaki Maeno, Yoshimasa Hosoya, and Kenn)
Gekkan Shoujo Nozaki-kun (as Mikoto Mikoshiba)
(2014.09.24) Gekkan Shoujo Nozaki-kun Special Character Song CD Vol. 1 
Ore no Te de SPARKING!! (SPARKING in my hand!!)
Ace of Diamond
Ace of Diamond Character Song Vol. 4 (as Ryosuke Kominato)
(2014.12.03) Oikaze ni Tsugu
Assassination Classroom (as Akabane Karma)
Opening Theme – The Theory of Savage Youth (with Mai Fuchigami, Aya Suzaki, Ryota Ohsaka, and Shintaro Asanuma)
Second Opening Theme – Self-reliance Revolution (with Mai Fuchigami, Aya Suzaki, Ryota Ohsaka, and Shintaro Asanuma)
Assassination Classroom: Second Season (as Akabane Karma)
Opening Theme – QUESTION (with Mai Fuchigami, Aya Suzaki, Ryota Ohsaka, and Shintaro Asanuma)
Second Opening Theme – Bye Bye YESTERDAY (with Mai Fuchigami, Aya Suzaki, Ryota Ohsaka, and Shintaro Asanuma)
Vatican Miracle Examiner (as Hiraga Josef Kō)
Ending Theme – Sacrament

Game (PSP) songs
 Death Connection
 (2010.06.16) Death Connection Character Song Album
 promise (as Leonardo)
 『恋は校則に縛られない！』(as Satoshi/Kyo)
(2012.11.17)『恋は校則に縛られない！』オープニングテーマ「Brand New World」
1.「Brand New World」with Yūki Kaji, Terashima Takuma, Miyu Irino, and Kōsuke Toriumi
2.「Brand New World　– Instrumental -」　
3.「Brand New World　– Game Size -」
4.「Brand New World　– Instrumental / Game Size -」
(2012.11.17) キャラクターソングコレクション Vol.03　羽々崎 暁／キョウ（岡本信彦）
1.「Heads or Tails」
2.「Brand New World -Satoshi ver.-」
3.「Heads or Tails -only Satoshi ver.-」
4.「Heads or Tails -only Kyo ver.-」
5.「Heads or Tails – off vocal ver. -」
6.「Brand New World – off vocal / Satoshi ver.-」
 Koi Hana Days
 (2013.06.26) Koi Hana Days OP&ED – Koi Tsubomi / Ai no Hanataba
 愛の花束 (Ai no Hanataba) (as Tsukasa Ranki)
 Harukanaru Toki no Naka de 5
 (2013.05.29) Harukanaru Toki no Naka de 5 〜Akatsuki no Koi uta〜 2 Vocal Song CD
 朝に夕べに (Ashita ni Yuube ni) (as Okita Souji)
 誠一路 (Makoto Ichiro) with Tetsu Inada and Takanori Hoshino
Vinculum Hearts -Iris Mahou Gakkou- 
(2014.11.12) Vinculum Hearts -Iris Mahou Gakkou- Intro Theme
Hajimari no Yakusoku (as Iris)

Drama CD songs
 Rikei Danshi. Benkyo ni Naru!? (as Hazeru Mizunomoto)
 (2009.06.24) Rikei Danshi. Benkyo ni Naru!? Character Song Vol.1 – Hazeru Mizunomoto
 並べ!元素記号 (勉強科目:化学) (Narabe! Ganso Kigou)
 原子分子マイン～ぼくらの理科室～ (『理系男子。』主題歌 【水ノ素 爆】 ソロバージョン) (Genshi bunshi Main ~Boku wa no Rika Shitsu~)
 モノローグドラマ 水ノ素 爆 編 (Monologue Drama Mizu no Moto Bao-Hen)
 (2010.10.27) Rikei Danshi. Benkyo ni Naru!? Character song Second stage Vol. 1 – Hazeru Mizunomoto & Genki Haihara
 結晶バンザイ! (勉強科目: 化学) (Kessho banzai! (Benkyou Kamoku: kagaku))
 情熱ヾ(*・∀・)ノスペクトル (勉強科目: 物理) (Jonetsu ( A ) no Spectrum (Benkyou Kamoku – Butsuri))
 葉緑体 ~僕と君と緑と光~ (勉強科目: 生物) (Yoryokutai ~Boku to Kimi to Midori to Hikari~ (Benkyou Kamoku: Seibutsu)) (by Daisuke Ono)
 進化☆ミラクル (勉強科目: 地学) (Shinka Miracle (Benkyou Kamoku: Chigaku)) (by Daisuke Ono)
 fellowそぞろfollow (fellow Sozoro follow) (with Daisuke Ono)
 ミニドラマ「ひまわり畑で」 (Mini Drama 'Himawari Hatake de) (with Daisuke Ono)

Cover songs
 Disney
 Disney Love Stories (Disney – Koe no Ojisama Vol.2)
 Hakuna Matata (duet with Hiro Shimono)
 Good Company

References

External links
Official blog (in Japanese)
Official agency profile (as voice actor) 
Nobuhiko Okamoto at Kiramune (as singer) 
Nobuhiko Okamoto  at GamePlaza-Haruka Voice Acting Database 
Nobuhiko Okamoto at Hitoshi Doi's Seiyuu Database

1986 births
Living people
Japanese male pop singers
Japanese male video game actors
Japanese male voice actors
Lantis (company) artists
Male voice actors from Tokyo
Seiyu Award winners
Singers from Tokyo
21st-century Japanese male actors
21st-century Japanese singers
21st-century Japanese male singers